Eduard Alexander Rubin (17 July 1846 – 6 July 1920) was a Swiss  mechanical engineer who is most notable for having invented the full metal jacket bullet in 1882.  His most famous cartridge was the 7.5×55mm Swiss which was the standard ammunition for the Schmidt–Rubin, K31 and Stgw 57 military rifles. Besides the full metal jacket bullet, Rubin developed the military Schmidt-Rubin rifle (together with Rudolf Schmidt), the Rubin-Fornerod ignition mechanism and the use of TNT and ammonium nitrate to replace gunpowder in artillery grenades. His fully copper clad bullets were also the inspiration for the full metal jacket bullets introduced in 1886 for the Lebel rifle.  He served as director of the Swiss Federal Ammunition Factory and Research Center in Thun.
He held the rank of colonel in the Swiss military and was married to  Rosina Susanna Leuzinger, daughter of Swiss cartographer Rudolf Leuzinger.

References 

 
H. Ziegler, "Oberst Ed. Rubin : Direktor der eidg. Munitionsfabrik Thun" (obituary), Allgemeine schweizerische Militärzeitung 66.17  (1920), 281–283.

External links 
"Manufacture Dates of Swiss Schmidt–Rubin Rifles" (radix.net)
The History The 7.5 Swiss Cartridge (swissrifles.com)

1846 births
1920 deaths
Firearm designers
19th-century Swiss inventors